The Communist Party of Armenia was a branch of the Communist Party of the Soviet Union within the Armenian SSR, and as such, the sole ruling party in the Armenian SSR.

History
The first Marxist group in Armenia was founded by Stepan Shaumian in 1899 in Jalaloghli (modern-day Stepanavan). In 1902, Shaumian, Bogdan Knunyants and Arshak Zurabov founded the Union of Armenian Social Democrats was founded in 1902 in Tiflis (Tbilisi) as a branch of the Russian Social Democratic Labour Party. Like its parent organization, it split into a Bolshevik and Menshevik faction.

During the existence of the First Republic of Armenia (1918–1920), the Armenian Bolsheviks actively struggled against the government led by the Armenian Revolutionary Federation (Dashnaktsutiun). In September 1919, the Bolshevik organizations of Armenia created the Armenia Committee (Armenkom) of the Russian Communist Party (Bolsheviks). In May 1920, they led a failed armed uprising against the ARF-led government. Many of Armenian Bolsheviks were executed or forced to flee to newly sovietized Azerbaijan following the failed uprising, and the communists' activities in Armenia practically ceased.

On 30 June 1920, the Russian Communist Party authorized the creation of the Communist parties of Armenia, Azerbaijan and Georgia, which were to be subordinated to the Caucasian Bureau of the party. Another party called the Communist Party of Armenia, which had been created in 1918 to spread Bolshevik propaganda among Western Armenian refugees, was merged with the main Communist Party of Armenia. In November 1920, the Armenian Revolutionary Committee (Armrevkom, chaired by Sarkis Kasyan) was created in Baku to facilitate the sovietization of Armenia. On 29 November 1920, Armrevkom crossed into Armenia from Azerbaijan together with the Red Army and declared the Armenian Soviet Socialist Republic.

The Communist Party of Armenia's first congress took place in January 1922, the same year that the Soviet Union was officially founded with the Transcaucasian SFSR (and with it Soviet Armenia) as a constituent member.

Many of the party's leaders were accused of being Trotskyists or Dashnakist and executed in 1937.

Dissolution and succession
In the elections for the Supreme Soviet of the Armenian SSR in 1990, the Communist Party of Armenia came in second to the non-communist Pan-Armenian National Movement. On 4 August 1990, Levon Ter-Petrosyan was elected chairman of the Supreme Soviet. This was the first time that a non-communist party had come to power in a Soviet republic. The 19th Congress of the Communist Party of Armenia, held on 7 September 1991, decided to dissolve the party. The party's last leader, Aram G. Sargsyan, created the Democratic Party of Armenia. The same year, the new Armenian Communist Party was established under the leadership of Sergey Badalyan, which considered itself the successor of the Soviet Communist Party of Armenia.

Leaders
The title of the leader of the party almost always was "First Secretary of the Central Committee of the Communist Party of Armenia".

Publications
The party published the daily newspaper Sovetakan Hayastan ("Soviet Armenia") and the monthly magazine Leninyan Ughiov ("On Lenin's Path").

References

Armenia
Armenia
Parties of one-party systems
Communist parties in Armenia
Communist parties in the Soviet Union
Defunct political parties in Armenia
Armenian Soviet Socialist Republic
1920 establishments in Russia
1991 disestablishments in the Soviet Union